Mossendjo Airport  is an airport serving the town of Mossendjo in the Niari Department, Republic of the Congo. The runway is on the west end of the town.

See also

 List of airports in the Republic of the Congo
 Transport in the Republic of the Congo

References

External links
OpenStreetMap - Mossendjo
OurAirports - Mossendjo

Airports in the Republic of the Congo